Peter Pokorny (born 25 July 1940) is a former professional Austrian tennis player who was active in the 1960s and 1970s.

His best singles result at a Grand Slam tournament was reaching the second round at the 1971 French Open after a first round win against Bob Giltinan. In the second round he lost to Nicola Pietrangeli in four sets. At Wimbledon he qualified for the main singles draw in 1966, 1969 and 1973 but did not manage to make it past the first round. 

In 1973 he won the singles title at the international German indoor championships in Bremen after a five-sets victory in the final against Tadeusz Nowicki.

Pokorny played in 14 ties for the Austrian Davis Cup team between 1963 and 1974 and had a 8–25 win–loss record.

As a senior player Pokorny won many European and World Championships.

References

External links
 Official website
 
 
 

Austrian male tennis players
1940 births
Living people
Sportspeople from Graz